The Nationalities Working Group was established on 20 January 1978 as a group within the National Security Council of the US which functioned under the umbrella of the East-West Planning Group. It was originally headed by Paul B. Henze. Other participants included the CIA veteran Jeremy Azrael.

References

United States National Security Council
CIA and Islamism
1978 establishments in the United States